Eddie Ray Vowell (born December 13, 1946) is a retired American football coach. He is best known for serving as head football coach at Texas A&M University–Commerce from 1986 to 1998. He is second in program history with 73 career wins and led the Lions to the 1990 Lone Star Conference championship and appearances in the NCAA Division II playoffs in 1990, 1991, and 1995.

Early life
Vowell was born in Oklahoma but was raised in the small Texas Panhandle community of Mobeetie. He graduated from Mobeetie High School in 1965. He then attended Southwestern Oklahoma State University in Weatherford, Oklahoma, graduating with a bachelor's degree in 1969 and a master's degree in 1978. While at Southwestern Oklahoma State, he was a member of the Bulldogs track team and also was on the dean's list.

Coaching career

Early coaching
After graduating, Vowell coached at several high schools in Texas. He coached David Bailiff while in San Antonio and coached at Gainesville High School in Gainesville, Texas before joining the staff at East Texas State.

East Texas State
Vowell was hired by Ernest Hawkins in 1983 as East Texas State's defensive coordinator and track and field coach. He helped lead the Lions to a share of the 1983 Lone Star Conference title.

In 1985, Hawkins announced his retirement from coaching and that he would be transitioning to athletic administration at East Texas State. Vowell was hired as head football coach. In Vowell's first two seasons, the Lions struggled, posting 2–9 records in 1986 and 1987, but the 1988 Lion team finished with an 8–3 record and reached as high as #2 in the national polls, before dropping their two final games to lost out on a conference title and playoff bid. Nonetheless, he was named conference Coach of The Year. The Lions regressed to 4–6 in 1989, but then posted a 10–3 season in 1990 and won the Lone Star Conference with a perfect 7–0 record. They qualified for the national playoffs in 1990, losing in the National Quarterfinals, and again Vowell was named Coach of the Year in the Lone Star Conference. In 1991, the Lions finished second in LSC and returned to the playoffs, finishing as National quarterfinalists again and posted an 8–3 record in 1992. After two .500 seasons, the 1995 Lions returned to the playoffs, finishing 11th in the country. Vowell retired at the end of the 1998 season.

Arena Football League
Vowell was an assistant coach for the Tampa Bay Storm of the Arena Football League from 1998 to 2002 and again from 2007 to 2008. He also coached the Austin Wranglers as an assistant.

Notable players coached
 Bobby Bounds, starting quarterback for the AFL's Cleveland Thunderbolts
 Gary Compton, wide receiver in the NFL, WLF, and AFL
 Mike Trigg, quarterback and coach in the Arena Football League
 Clint Dolezel, Hall of Fame Arena League quarterback and current coach of the Philadelphia Soul
 Curtis Buckley, NFL's Tampa Bay Buccaneers and San Francisco 49ers. 
 Kevin Mathis, NFL's Dallas Cowboys and Atlanta Falcons 
 Antonio Wilson, NFL's Minnesota Vikings and the CFL's Edmontons Eskimos
 Cedric Bonner, NFL's Atlanta Falcons and Washington Redskins
 Bo Kelly, fullback in the Arena Football League
 Billy Minor, NFL's Philadelphia Eagles and Arena League's Dallas Texans

Personal
Vowell lives in Campbell, Texas, just south of Commerce, with his wife Jan.

Honors
 2 Time Lone Star Conference Coach of the Year (1988, 1990)
 2 Time Lone Star Conference Champion (1983 as an ASST), 1990 (As Head Coach)
 3 Time NCAA Division II Playoff Qualifier (1990, 1991, 1995)
 Texas A&M University-Commerce Athletic Hall of Fame (2011)

Head coaching record

College

References

1946 births
Living people
Austin Wranglers coaches
Grand Rapids Rampage coaches
Tampa Bay Storm coaches
Texas A&M–Commerce Lions football coaches
College men's track and field athletes in the United States
College track and field coaches in the United States
High school football coaches in Texas
Southwestern Oklahoma State University alumni
People from Mobeetie, Texas
Sportspeople from Oklahoma
Track and field athletes from Texas